The Type DT2 is a two-car electric multiple unit (EMU) train type operated by the Hamburger Hochbahn AG on the Hamburg U-Bahn until 2015. They replaced the Type T and Type TU.

Technical specifications
The first trains had a Bo'1+1 Bo''' axle layout, with later trains built to an articulated design, formed as two-car sets. The car body was constructed using lightweight steel, based on a design licensed from the American Budd Company. They are equipped with Kiepe-build quill drives.

Interior
Seating arrangement consists of seating bays in a 2+2 layout.

History
A total of 186 sets were delivered in five batches between 1962 and 1966. They were withdrawn after farewell runs through the entire network on November 28, 2015.

Refurbishment
Some sets underwent refurbishment from 1985 to 1987, which included replacement of the old cab ends and addition of fire-resistant interior fittings. A microprocessor-controlled wheel slide protection system was also retrofitted. These rebuilt units were designated as DT2.5-E''. As a result of the refurbishment the units could stay in service for another 20 years.

Preserved examples
One unrefurbished unit, set 604, was taken out of service in 2002 is being preserved for a later use as a museum car. In 2013 it had to be partly cannibalized since it was the only option to get spare parts for the DT2E cars that were still in service then. Shortly before they were scrapped in 2016 all of these parts were taken from the DT2E again to allow a re-completion of set 604 as soon as its restoration begins.

References

External links

 DT2 farewell run - press release on hochbahn.de 

Hamburg U-Bahn
Electric multiple units of Germany
750 V DC multiple units